The Little Saw Mill Run Railroad was a  coal railroad in Allegheny County, Pennsylvania.  It was incorporated July 23, 1850, and opened in April 1853. Originally, it was owned by the Harmony Society, and ran from Temperanceville, Pennsylvania on the Ohio River to Banksville, Pennsylvania, running parallel to Saw Mill Run and Little Saw Mill Run. In an agreement with the  narrow gauge Pittsburgh Southern Railroad, it ran dual gauge tracks.  It became part of the railroad empire of George J. Gould, merging with the West Side Belt Railroad in 1897. The superintendent of the Marine Railway at Sawmill Run for 13 years was Captain Edward Boland.

References

History of Allegheny County, Pennsylvania
Defunct Pennsylvania railroads
Transportation in Pittsburgh
Narrow gauge railroads in Pennsylvania
3 ft gauge railways in the United States
Railway companies established in 1850
Railway companies disestablished in 1897
Predecessors of the Norfolk and Western Railway
American companies disestablished in 1897